Pupa nitulida, common name the smooth pink pupa, is a species of small sea snail, a marine gastropod mollusc in the family Acteonidae.

Description
The length of the shell varies between 10 mm and 20 mm.

The thick, ovate shell is oblong and smooth. It is of rosy white color. It shows transverse striae varying in number at the base of the body whorl. The spire is short and pointed at its summit. It is composed of six or seven very approximate whorls. The aperture is oblong, narrow, and a little effuse at its base. The outer lip is thickened upon its interior, smooth and sharp throughout its whole extent. The columella, which is thickened, shows two folds. Of these two, the lower fold is the larger and is sub-quadrangular, the upper, which is much smaller, is separated from the other, by a semicircular, very deep groove.

Distribution
This marine species occurs in the Indian Ocean off East Africa, Madagascar, Réunion, Mascarene Basin; off the Philippines, New Caledonia and Australia (Queensland)

References

 Wägele, H., Burghardt, I., Anthes, N., Evertsen, J., Klussmann-Kolb, A. & Brodie, G. 2006. Species diversity of opisthobranch molluscs on Lizard Island, Great Barrier Reef, Australia. Records of the Western Australian Museum, Supplement 69. 33–59
 Poppe G. (2010) Philippine marine mollusks volume 3. 665 pp., pls 708–1014. Hackenheim: Conchbooks.

Acteonidae
Gastropods described in 1816